6-(2-Aminopropyl)tetralin (6-APT), also sometimes called tetralinylaminopropane (TAP), is a drug of the amphetamine class which acts as a selective serotonin releasing agent (SSRA). It has IC50 values of 121 nM, 6,436 nM, and 3,371 nM for inhibiting the reuptake of serotonin, dopamine, and norepinephrine, respectively. Though it possesses an appreciable in vitro profile, in animal drug discrimination studies it was not found to substitute for MMAI or amphetamine and to only partially substitute for MBDB. This parallels Alexander Shulgin's finding that EDMA (the 1,4-benzodioxine analogue of 6-APT) is inactive, and appears to indicate that the pharmacokinetics of both EDMA and 6-APT may not be favorable.

See also 
 2-Aminotetralin
 5-APDI
 Naphthylaminopropane
 TH-PVP

References 

Substituted amphetamines
Tetralins
Serotonin releasing agents
Entactogens and empathogens